Gromit Unleashed 2 was a public arts trail in Bristol, England. The trail featured 67 giant sculptures designed by high-profile artists, designers, innovators and local talent. Sculptures are positioned in high footfall and iconic locations around Bristol and the surrounding area from 2 July to 2 September 2018.  A sequel to Gromit Unleashed in 2013, the trail featured statues of Wallace on a life-size bench, Gromit, and Feathers McGraw.

The trail raised funds for the Bristol Royal Hospital for Children and St. Michael's Hospital's Special Care Baby unit.

Background

Gromit 

Gromit is a dog belonging to an eccentric inventor, Wallace, in a series of claymation films produced by Aardman Animations, based in Spike Island, Bristol. Three of the films in the Wallace and Gromit film series have won Academy Awards: The Wrong Trousers, A Close Shave and Wallace & Gromit: The Curse of the Were-Rabbit.

Wallace and Gromit's Grand Appeal 
The aim of Gromit Unleashed was to fundraise for Wallace and Gromit's Grand Appeal. Founded in 1995, the charity raises funds for paediatric medical equipment at the Bristol Royal Hospital for Children and St. Michael's Hospital. In collaboration with Aardman, it uses the characters Wallace and Gromit as mascots for the charity.

Previous trails
Gromit Unleashed 2 is a sequel to Gromit Unleashed that ran between 1 July and 8 September 2013 in Bristol, featuring 80 Gromit sculptures and raising £2.3 million for the Grand Appeal.  The Shaun in the City trail featuring 120 sculptures of Shaun the Sheep were distributed between Bristol and London in 2015 and raised £1,087,900  for the charity. Following their respective successes in raising funds for the Grand Appeal, Gromit Unleashed 2 was announced in 2017.

List of sculptures

Gromit

Wallace

Feathers McGraw

Footnotes

'Trailblazer' interactive sculptures

References 

2018 sculptures
Painted statue public art
Sculptures in England
Arts in Bristol
Wallace and Gromit
Statues of fictional characters